The 1994 Italian Open was a tennis tournament played on outdoor clay courts. It was the 51st edition of the Italian Open, and was part of the ATP Super 9 of the 1994 ATP Tour, and of the Tier I Series of the 1994 WTA Tour. Both the men's and the women's events took place at the Foro Italico in Rome, Italy. The women's tournament was played from May 2 through May 8, 1994, and the men's tournament was played from May 9 through May 16, 1994.

Finals

Men's singles

 Pete Sampras defeated  Boris Becker, 6–1, 6–2, 6–2
It was Pete Sampras' 7th title of the year and his 28th overall. It was his 3rd Masters title of the year and his 5th overall.

Women's singles

 Conchita Martínez defeated  Martina Navratilova, 7–6, 6–4
It was Conchita Martinez's 2nd title of the year and her 18th overall. It was her 2nd Tier I title of the year and her 4th overall. It was her 2nd title at the event, also winning in 1993.

Men's doubles

 Yevgeny Kafelnikov /  David Rikl defeated  Wayne Ferreira /  Javier Sánchez, 6–1, 7–5

Women's doubles

 Gigi Fernández /  Natasha Zvereva defeated  Gabriela Sabatini /  Brenda Schultz, 6–1, 6–3

References

External links
WTA Tour Final Results: 1971-2007